Jason Williams (born April 15, 1979) is an American former basketball player.

Playing career
Williams is from Bladensburg, Maryland and attended Bladensburg High School. In his senior year of 1996–97, Williams was named to Prince George's County's 3A/2A First Team and also to the Washington, D.C. all-metro area fourth team.

Williams went on to play college basketball at Radford University from 1997 to 2001. During his four-year career, Williams recorded 1,176 points (12.6 per game average), 412 rebounds (4.4), 173 assists (1.9) and 128 steals (1.4). His best season came in 1999–2000 during his junior year. He averaged career-highs of 18.1 points and 6.5 rebounds per game as he led the Highlanders to a 12–2 Big South Conference record. They won the conference regular season championship and Williams was named the Big South Conference Player of the Year. Other accolades in college include being a two-time First Team All-Conference player (2000, 2001) and an All-Big South tournament selection (2001).

After college, Williams had a brief stint in the NBA Development League. He appeared in eight games for the Greenville Groove in the late portion of the 2001–02 season. In the 2002 playoffs he appeared in five games; the Groove went on to win the D-League championship. In 2008–09 Williams played for Kecskeméti TE, a professional basketball team in Hungary.

References

External links
College statistics @ sports-reference.com
NBA D-League statistics

1979 births
Living people
Albany Patroons players
American expatriate basketball people in Hungary
American men's basketball players
Basketball players from Maryland
Forwards (basketball)
Greenville Groove players
Kecskeméti TE (basketball) players
People from Bladensburg, Maryland
Radford Highlanders men's basketball players
Sportspeople from the Washington metropolitan area